Vittel (archaic ) is a commune in the Vosges department in Grand Est in northeastern France.

Mineral water is bottled and sold here by Nestlé Waters France, under the Vittel brand.

History
In 1854, after visiting the baths at nearby Contrexéville, lawyer Louis Bouloumié purchased the Fontaine de Gérémoy, site of the modern-day town of Vittel.  Two years later, Bouloumie built a pavilion from which developed the grand, luxurious architecture which characterises the site. The town was also a recognized spa, bottling and exporting its waters.

In 1968, the Club Med was opened.

Mayors of Vittel

World War I
Home to U.S. Army Base Hospital 36 from Detroit, MI, from November 1917 until February 1919. This unit was formed at the Detroit College of Medicine and Surgery now Wayne State University, School of Medicine. They occupied the five resort hotels in the city plus the casino.

World War II
During the Battle of France in the summer of 1944, a small grass airstrip north of the town was used for light liaison aircraft by the United States Army Air Forces.   The Twelfth Air Force headquartered several fighter wings in Vittel during their drive east into Germany. In 1945, that flat, grassy area of land (now a racetrack for horses) was used as a holding area for captured Luftwaffe aircraft before their shipment to the United Kingdom and the United States for evaluation (Operation Lusty).

Vittel served as an internment camp for enemy aliens of the German Reich during World War II.  Hundreds of American and British families were interned there from September 1942. A few hundred Jewish people, citizens of German enemies, were also sent there by the Germans who hoped to use them to exchange for German prisoners or nationals held elsewhere.  Most of Vittel's Jewish detainees were deported to Auschwitz and murdered there in 1944. The order of Catholic nuns, were charged with looking after Jewish girls who were interned there.

The town was liberated by the US Army on September 10, 1944. In October 1944, the Hotel Continental was then used as part of U. S. Army Base Hospital Number 23.

See also
 Communes of the Vosges department

References

External links

 Town council website
 Spa house website

Communes of Vosges (department)
Spa towns in France
Duchy of Lorraine